Notes and the Like is the second studio album by German indie electronic band Ms. John Soda. It was released on 3 March 2006 by Morr Music.

Reception

At Metacritic, which assigns a weighted average score out of 100 to reviews from mainstream critics, Notes and the Like received an average score of 66 based on seven reviews, indicating "generally favorable reviews".

Track listing

Personnel
Credits are adapted from the album's liner notes.

Ms. John Soda
 Micha Acher
 Stefanie Böhm

Additional musicians

 Thomas Geltinger
 Elias Giggenbach
 Johanna Giggenbach
 Carl Oesterhelt
 Andreas Gerth – additional programming
 Aqua Luminus III – Akai MPC
 Mathis Mayr – cello
 Wolfgang Schönwetter – horns
 Stefan Schreiber – flute, saxophone
 Tobi Weber – viola

Production

 Michael Heilrath – mixing
 Ms. John Soda – mixing
 Mario Thaler – additional recording
 Nick Webb – mastering

Design
 Jan Kruse – artwork
 Gerald von Foris – photography

References

External links
 

2006 albums
Ms. John Soda albums
Morr Music albums